Joel Birman is a Brazilian psychiatrist and psychotherapist. He was born in Vitória, State of Espírito Santo of Romanian Jewish immigrant parents. He graduated in Medicine in the 1970s and pursued his post graduate studies in São Paulo and Paris. Birman is one of the most prolific Brazilian authors in the field of psychoanalysis and has written several books in Brazil and France. He is currently professor of Psychology in the Federal University of Rio de Janeiro (UFRJ) and of Social Medicine in the University of the State of Rio de Janeiro (UERJ).

He's also starting, at Collège International de Philosophie, Paris, a line of research interdisciplinary with Psychotherapy and Philosophy about the "New conditions of the mal estar in the civilization".

References 

Brazilian Jews
Brazilian psychiatrists
Living people
Academic staff of the Federal University of Rio de Janeiro
Year of birth missing (living people)
Brazilian people of Romanian-Jewish descent
Academic staff of the Rio de Janeiro State University
20th-century Brazilian physicians
21st-century Brazilian physicians